Puerto Rico made its Paralympic Games début at the 1988 Summer Paralympics in Seoul, with a delegation of twelve competitors in archery, athletics, shooting and table tennis. It has participated in every subsequent edition of the Summer Paralympics. The country is set to first compete at the Winter Paralympics in 2022.

Puerto Ricans have won a total of six Paralympic medals: a gold, two silver and three bronze. During their inaugural participation in 1988, Puerto Rico collected three medals: a gold and two silver. All three were won by Isabel Bustamante in field events (shot put, discus and javelin), in category 1B. The country then had to wait until 2000 for its next medal, when Alexis Pizarro took bronze in the men's shot put (F57 category). He was Puerto Rico's sole medallist again in 2004, this time with a bronze in the javelin. Most recent, Nilda Gomez Lopez won bronze in the women's air rifle (standing event, category SH1) in 2008.

Medalists

See also

 Puerto Rico at the Olympics

References